Mohamed Chibi (born 21 January 1993) is a Moroccan professional footballer who plays as a right-back for Pyramids FC, and the Morocco national team.

Career
A youth product of Raja, Chibi began his senior career with them in 2011 signing a 5-year professional contract. He shortly after went on successive loans to Kawkab Marrakech and CRA, before transferring to Ittihad Khemisset in 2014. In 2015, he moved to KAC Kénitra where he became the starter. He had stints at Moghreb Tétouan and Khénifra, before moving to AS FAR in 2018. He moved to Ittihad Tanger for 2 years in 2019, before returning to AS FAR.

International career
Chibi debuted with the Morocco national team in a 3–0 2022 FIFA World Cup qualification win over Sudan on 12 November 2021.

International goals

Honours
Morocco
Arab Cup U-20: 2011

References

External links
 
 

1993 births
Living people
Footballers from Casablanca
Moroccan footballers
Morocco international footballers
Morocco youth international footballers
Association football fullbacks
Raja CA players
Ittihad Khemisset players
Moghreb Tétouan players
AS FAR (football) players
Ittihad Tanger players
Botola players
2021 Africa Cup of Nations players